The Jawahar Kala Kendra (JKK) is a multi arts centre located in the city of Jaipur, India. It was built by Government of Rajasthan with the purpose of preserving Rajasthani arts and crafts.

The centre has been made in eight blocks housing museums, one amphi theatre and the other closed auditorium, library, arts display rooms, cafeteria, small hostel and art-studio.

It also houses two permanent art galleries and three other galleries. and host its own theatre festival each year.

Architecture

The design was prepared by the noted architect Charles Correa in 1986 and the building was ready in 1992. The plan is inspired by the original city plan of Jaipur, consisting of nine squares with central square left open.

The Jawahar Kala Kendra adapts and applies concepts from ancient architectural principles called the Vastu Vidya.

The centre is an analogue of the original city pIan of the city of Jaipur drawn up by the Maharaja, a scholar, mathematician and astronomer, Jai Singh the Second, in the mid-17th century. His city plan, guided by the Shipla Shastras, was based on the ancient Vedic madala of nine squares or houses which represent the nine planets (including two imaginary ones Ketu and Rahu). Due to the presence of a hill one of the squares was transposed to the east and two of the squares were amalgamated to house the palace.

Correa's plan for the Kendra invokes directly the original navagraha or nine house mandala. One of the squares is pivoted to recall the original city plan and also to create the entrance. The plan of Jaipur city based on the nine square Yantra in which one square is displaced and two central squares combined. the squares is defined by 8m high wall, symbolic of the fortification wall along the Jaipur old city

Theatre

Rangayan, Mihir, Open Theatre, are few of the many theatres housed in JKK.

Gallery

References

External links
Jawahar Kala Kendra A Case-study by students of School of Planning & Architecture, New Delhi

Buildings and structures completed in 1991
Rajasthani arts
Tourist attractions in Jaipur
Art museums and galleries in India
Folk art museums and galleries in India
Museums in Rajasthan
Buildings and structures in Jaipur
Postmodern architecture in India
Charles Correa buildings
Arts centres in India
Monuments and memorials to Jawaharlal Nehru
Museums in Jaipur
1991 establishments in Rajasthan
20th-century architecture in India